Ripping Corpse was a death metal band formed in 1987 in Red Bank, New Jersey.

History
They released one album, Dreaming with the Dead (1991), and several highly regarded demos. Members included singer Scott Ruth, guitarist Shaune Kelley, bassist David Bizzigotti, and drummer Brandon Thomas. They later added future Morbid Angel guitarist Erik Rutan, who went on to form Hate Eternal. They also replaced Bizzigotti with Scott Hornick. Thomas, Ruth, and Kelley went on to form Dim Mak. The band's lyrics typically were horror-themed.

The band took its name from the second song on Kreator's second album, Pleasure to Kill.

Discography
 Death Warmed Over, Independent, 1987 (Demo)
 Splattered Remains, Independent, 1988 (Demo)
 Glorious Depravity, Independent, 1990 (Demo)
 Dreaming with the Dead, Kraze/Maze America, 1991 (LP)
 Industry, Independent, 1992 (Demo)

Personnel
Scott Ruth: Vocals
Shaune Kelley: Guitars
Erik Rutan: Guitars
Scott Hornick: Bass
David Bizzigotti: Bass
Brandon Thomas: Drums

References

External links
 Official Ripping Corpse Myspace page
Dim Mak Official Myspace page

Heavy metal musical groups from New Jersey
American death metal musical groups
Musical groups established in 1987
Musical groups disestablished in 1995
Musical quintets
Music of Red Bank, New Jersey